The Big Five personality traits is a suggested taxonomy, or grouping, for personality traits, developed from the 1980s onward in psychological trait theory.

Starting in the 1990s, the theory identified five factors by labels, for the US English speaking population, typically referred to as:
 openness to experience (inventive/curious vs. consistent/cautious)
conscientiousness (efficient/organized vs. extravagant/careless)
extraversion (outgoing/energetic vs. solitary/reserved)
 agreeableness (friendly/compassionate vs. critical/rational)
 neuroticism (sensitive/nervous vs. resilient/confident)

When factor analysis is applied to personality survey data, it reveals semantic associations: some words used to describe aspects of personality are often applied to the same person. For example, someone described as conscientious is more likely to be described as "always prepared" rather than "messy". These associations suggest five broad dimensions used in common language to describe the human personality, temperament and psyche.

Those labels for the five factors may be remembered using the acronyms "OCEAN" or "CANOE". Beneath each proposed global factor, there are a number of correlated and more specific primary factors. For example, extraversion is typically associated with qualities such as gregariousness, assertiveness, excitement-seeking, warmth, activity, and positive emotions. These traits are not black and white, but rather placed on continua.

Development 
The Big Five personality traits was the model to comprehend the relationship between personality and academic behaviors. This model was defined by several independent sets of researchers who used factor analysis of verbal descriptors of human behavior. These researchers began by studying relationships between a large number of verbal descriptors related to personality traits. They reduced the lists of these descriptors by 5–10 fold and then used factor analysis to group the remaining traits (using data mostly based upon people's estimations, in self-report questionnaire and peer ratings) in order to find the underlying factors of personality.

The initial model was advanced by Ernest Tupes and Raymond Christal in 1958, but failed to reach an academic audience until the 1980s. In 1990, J.M. Digman advanced his five-factor model of personality, which Lewis Goldberg extended to the highest level of organization. These five overarching domains have been found to contain and subsume most known personality traits and are assumed to represent the basic structure behind all personality traits.

At least four sets of researchers have worked independently within lexical hypothesis in personality theory for decades on this problem and have identified generally the same five factors: Tupes and Christal were first, followed by Goldberg at the Oregon Research Institute, Cattell at the University of Illinois, and Costa and McCrae. These four sets of researchers used somewhat different methods in finding the five traits, and thus each set of five factors has somewhat different names and definitions. However, all have been found to be highly inter-correlated and factor-analytically aligned. Studies indicate that the Big Five traits are not nearly as powerful in predicting and explaining actual behavior as are the more numerous facets or primary traits.

Each of the Big Five personality traits contains two separate, but correlated, aspects reflecting a level of personality below the broad domains but above the many facet scales that are also part of the Big Five. The aspects are labeled as follows: Volatility and Withdrawal for Neuroticism; Enthusiasm and Assertiveness for Extraversion; Intellect and Openness for Openness to Experience; Industriousness and Orderliness for Conscientiousness; and Compassion and Politeness for Agreeableness. People who do not exhibit a clear predisposition to a single factor in each dimension above are considered adaptable, moderate and reasonable, yet they can also be perceived as unprincipled, inscrutable and calculating.

Descriptions of the particular personality traits

Openness to experience

Openness to experience is a general appreciation for art, emotion, adventure, unusual ideas, imagination, curiosity, and variety of experience. People who are open to experience are intellectually curious, open to emotion, sensitive to beauty and willing to try new things. They tend to be, when compared to closed people, more creative and more aware of their feelings. They are also more likely to hold unconventional beliefs. High openness can be perceived as unpredictability or lack of focus, and more likely to engage in risky behavior or drug-taking. Moreover, individuals with high openness are said to pursue self-actualization specifically by seeking out intense, euphoric experiences. Conversely, those with low openness seek to gain fulfillment through perseverance and are characterized as pragmatic and data-drivensometimes even perceived to be dogmatic and closed-minded. Some disagreement remains about how to interpret and contextualize the openness factor as there is a lack of biological support for this particular trait. Openness has not shown a significant association with any brain regions as opposed to the other four traits which did when using brain imaging to detect changes in volume associated with each trait.

Sample items

 I have a rich vocabulary.
I have a vivid imagination.
I have excellent ideas.
I am quick to understand things.
I use difficult words.
I spend time reflecting on things.
I am full of ideas.
I have difficulty understanding abstract ideas. (Reversed)
I am not interested in abstract ideas. (Reversed)
I do not have a good imagination. (Reversed)

Conscientiousness
Conscientiousness is a tendency to display self-discipline, act dutifully, and strive for achievement against measures or outside expectations. It is related to the way in which people control, regulate, and direct their impulses. High conscientiousness is often perceived as being stubborn and focused. Low conscientiousness is associated with flexibility and spontaneity, but can also appear as sloppiness and lack of reliability. High scores on conscientiousness indicate a preference for planned rather than spontaneous behavior. The average level of conscientiousness rises among young adults and then declines among older adults.

Sample items 
 I am always prepared.
I pay attention to details.
I get chores done right away.
I like order.
I follow a schedule.
I am exacting in my work.
I leave my belongings around. (Reversed)
I make a mess of things. (Reversed)
I often forget to put things back in their proper place. (Reversed)
I shirk my duties. (Reversed)

Extraversion
Extraversion is characterized by breadth of activities (as opposed to depth), surgency from external activity/situations, and energy creation from external means. The trait is marked by pronounced engagement with the external world. Extraverts enjoy interacting with people, and are often perceived as full of energy. They tend to be enthusiastic, action-oriented individuals. They possess high group visibility, like to talk, and assert themselves. Extraverted people may appear more dominant in social settings, as opposed to introverted people in this setting.

Introverts have lower social engagement and energy levels than extraverts. They tend to seem quiet, low-key, deliberate, and less involved in the social world. Their lack of social involvement should not be interpreted as shyness or depression; instead they are more independent of their social world than extraverts. Introverts need less stimulation, and more time alone than extraverts. This does not mean that they are unfriendly or antisocial; rather, they are reserved in social situations.

Generally, people are a combination of extraversion and introversion, with personality psychologist Hans Eysenck suggesting a model by which individual neurological differences produce these traits.

Sample items 
 I am the life of the party.
 I feel comfortable around people.
 I start conversations.
 I talk to a lot of different people at parties.
I do not mind being the center of attention.
 I do not talk a lot. (Reversed)
I keep in the background. (Reversed)
I have little to say. (Reversed)
 I do not like to draw attention to myself. (Reversed)
 I am quiet around strangers. (Reversed)

Agreeableness
The agreeableness trait reflects individual differences in general concern for social harmony. Agreeable individuals value getting along with others. They are generally considerate, kind, generous, trusting and trustworthy, helpful, and willing to compromise their interests with others. Agreeable people also have an optimistic view of human nature.

Disagreeable individuals place self-interest above getting along with others. They are generally unconcerned with others' well-being and are less likely to extend themselves for other people. Sometimes their skepticism about others' motives causes them to be suspicious, unfriendly, and uncooperative. Low agreeableness personalities are often competitive or challenging people, which can be seen as argumentative or untrustworthy.

Because agreeableness is a social trait, research has shown that one's agreeableness positively correlates with the quality of relationships with one's team members. Agreeableness also positively predicts transformational leadership skills. In a study conducted among 169 participants in leadership positions in a variety of professions, individuals were asked to take a personality test and have two evaluations completed by directly supervised subordinates. Leaders with high levels of agreeableness were more likely to be considered transformational rather than transactional. Although the relationship was not strong (r=0.32, β=0.28, p<0.01), it was the strongest of the Big Five traits. However, the same study showed no predictive power of leadership effectiveness as evaluated by the leader's direct supervisor.

Conversely, agreeableness has been found to be negatively related to transactional leadership in the military. A study of Asian military units showed leaders with a high level of agreeableness to be more likely to receive a low rating for transformational leadership skills. Therefore, with further research, organizations may be able to determine an individual's potential for performance based on their personality traits. For instance, in their journal article "Which Personality Attributes Are Most Important in the Workplace?" Paul Sackett and Philip Walmsley claim that conscientiousness and agreeableness are "important to success across many different jobs."

Sample items 
 I am interested in people.
 I sympathize with others' feelings.
 I have a soft heart.
 I take time out for others.
 I feel others' emotions.
 I make people feel at ease.
 I am not really interested in others. (Reversed)
 I insult people. (Reversed)
 I am not interested in other people's problems. (Reversed)
 I feel little concern for others. (Reversed)

Neuroticism
Neuroticism is the tendency to experience negative emotions, such as anger, anxiety, or depression. It is sometimes called emotional instability, or is reversed and referred to as emotional stability. According to Hans Eysenck's (1967) theory of personality, neuroticism is interlinked with low tolerance for stress or aversive stimuli. Neuroticism is a classic temperament trait that has been studied in temperament research for decades, before it was adapted by the Five Factors Model.
Those who score high in neuroticism are emotionally reactive and vulnerable to stress. They are more likely to interpret ordinary situations as threatening. They can perceive minor frustrations as hopelessly difficult. They also tend to be flippant in the way they express emotions. Their negative emotional reactions tend to persist for unusually long periods of time, which means they are often in a bad mood. For instance, neuroticism is connected to a pessimistic approach toward work, to certainty that work impedes personal relationships, and to higher levels of anxiety from the pressures at work. Furthermore, those who score high on neuroticism may display more skin-conductance reactivity than those who score low on neuroticism. These problems in emotional regulation can diminish the ability of a person scoring high on neuroticism to think clearly, make decisions, and cope effectively with stress. Lacking contentment in one's life achievements can correlate with high neuroticism scores and increase one's likelihood of falling into clinical depression. Moreover, individuals high in neuroticism tend to experience more negative life events, but neuroticism also changes in response to positive and negative life experiences. Also, individuals with higher levels of neuroticism tend to have worse psychological well-being.

At the other end of the scale, individuals who score low in neuroticism are less easily upset and are less emotionally reactive. They tend to be calm, emotionally stable, and free from persistent negative feelings. Freedom from negative feelings does not mean that low scorers experience a lot of positive feelings.

Neuroticism is similar but not identical to being neurotic in the Freudian sense (i.e., neurosis). Some psychologists prefer to call neuroticism by the term emotional instability to differentiate it from the term neurotic in a career test.

Sample items 

I get stressed out easily.
I worry about things.
I am easily disturbed.
I get upset easily.
I change my mood a lot.
I have frequent mood swings.
I get irritated easily.
I often feel blue.
I am relaxed most of the time. (Reversed)
I seldom feel blue. (Reversed)

History

Finding the five factors 
In 1884, British scientist Sir Francis Galton became the first person known to consider deriving a comprehensive taxonomy of human personality traits by sampling language. The idea that this may be possible is known as the lexical hypothesis.

In 1936, American psychologists Gordon Allport of Harvard University and Henry Odbert of Dartmouth College implemented Galton's hypothesis. They organised for three anonymous people to categorise adjectives from Webster's New International Dictionary and a list of common slang words. The result was a list of 4504 adjectives they believed were descriptive of observable and relatively permanent traits.

In 1943, the British-American Raymond Cattell of Harvard University took Allport and Odbert's list and reduced this to a list of "160 odd" terms by eliminating words with very similar meanings. To these, he added terms from 22 other psychological categories, and additional "interest" and "abilities" terms. This resulted in a list of 171 traits. From this he used factor analysis to derive 60 "personality clusters or syndromes", plus an additional 7 minor clusters.

Cattell then narrowed this down to 35 terms, and later added a 36th factor in the form of an IQ measure. Through factor analysis in 1945, 1947 and 1948 he created 11 or 12 factor solutions. The 1947 study surveyed university students, which Cattell deemed to have a broad range of personalities due to the cohort including many recently returned war veterans.

Also in 1947, German-British psychologist Hans Eysenck of University College London published his book Dimensions of Personality. He posited that the two most important personality dimensions were "Extraversion" and "Neuroticism" (a term he himself coined).

In July 1949, American Donald Fiske of the University of Chicago used 22 terms either taken or adapted from Cattell's 1947 study, and through surveys of male university students and statistics derived five factors: "Social Adaptability", "Emotional Control", "Conformity", "Inquiring Intellect", and "Confident Self-expression."

Also in 1949, Cattell found 4 additional factors, which he believed consisted of information that could only be provided through self-rating. With this understanding, he created the sixteen factor 16PF Questionnaire.

In 1953, American John W French of Educational Testing Service published an extensive meta-analysis of personality trait factor studies.

In 1957, American Ernest Tupes of the United States Air Force undertook a personality trait study of US Air Force officers. Each was rated by their peers using Cattell's 35 terms (or in some cases, the 30 most reliable terms).

In 1958, Tupes and fellow American Raymond Christal began a US Air Force study by taking 37 personality factors and other data found in Cattell's 1947 paper, Fiske's 1949 paper, and Tupes' 1957 paper. All but one of the factors chosen were in Cattell's paper, and that one was from Fiske. Through statistical analysis, they derived five factors they labeled "Surgency", "Agreeableness", "Dependability", "Emotional Stability", and "Culture". In addition to the influence of Cattell and Fiske's work, they strongly noted the influence of French's 1953 study.

Tupes and Christal further tested and explained their 1958 work in a 1961 paper.

American Warren Norman of the University of Michigan replicated Tupes and Christal's work in 1963. He relabeled "Surgency" as "Extroversion or Surgency", and "Dependability" as "Conscientiousness". He also found four subordinate scales for each factor. Norman's paper was much more read than Tupes and Christal's papers had been. (Norman's later Oregon Research Institute colleague Lewis Goldberg continued this work.)

In the 4th edition of the 16PF Questionnaire released in 1968, 5 "global factors" derived from the 16 factors were identified: "Extraversion", "Independence", "Anxiety", "Self-control" and "Tough-mindedness". 16PF advocates have since called these "the original Big 5".

Hiatus in research
During the 1970s, the changing zeitgeist made publication of personality research difficult. In his 1968 book Personality and Assessment, Walter Mischel asserted that personality instruments could not predict behavior with a correlation of more than 0.3. Social psychologists like Mischel argued that attitudes and behavior were not stable, but varied with the situation. Predicting behavior from personality instruments was claimed to be impossible.

Renewed attention
In 1978, Americans Paul Costa and Robert McCrae of the National Institutes of Health published a book chapter describing their Neuroticism-Extroversion-Openness (NEO) model. The model was based on the three factors in its name. They used Eysenck's concept of "Extroversion" rather than Carl Jung's. Each factor had six facets. The authors expanded their explanation of the model in subsequent papers.

Also in 1978, British psychologist Peter Saville of Brunel University applied statistical analysis to 16PF results, and determined that the model could be reduced to five factors, "Anxiety", "Extraversion", "Warmth", "Imagination" and "Conscientiousness."

At a 1980 symposium in Honolulu, Lewis Goldberg, Naomi Takemoto-Chock, Andrew Comrey, and John M. Digman, reviewed the available personality instruments of the day.

In 1981, Digman and Takemoto-Chock of the University of Hawaii reanalysed data from Cattell, Tupes, Norman, Fiske and Digman. They re-affirmed the validity of the five factors, naming them "Friendly Compliance vs. Hostile Non-compliance", "Extraversion vs. Introversion", "Ego Strength vs. Emotional Disorganization", "Will to Achieve" and "Intellect". They also found weak evidence for the existence of a sixth factor, "Culture".

A 1983 paper by GJ Boyle demonstrated that the predictions of personality models correlated better with real-life behavior under stressful emotional conditions, as opposed to typical survey administration under neutral emotional conditions.

Peter Saville and his team included the five-factor "Pentagon" model as part of the Occupational Personality Questionnaires (OPQ) in 1984. This was the first commercially available Big Five test. Its factors are "Extroversion", "Vigorous", "Methodical", "Emotional Stability", and "Abstract".

This was closely followed by another commercial test, the NEO PI three-factor personality inventory, published by Costa and McCrae in 1985. It used the three NEO factors. (The methodology employed in constructing the NEO instruments has been subject to critical scrutiny.)

Emerging methodologies increasingly confirmed personality theories during the 1980s. Though generally failing to predict single instances of behavior, researchers found that they could predict patterns of behavior by aggregating large numbers of observations. As a result, correlations between personality and behavior increased substantially, and it became clear that "personality" did in fact exist.

In a 1990 paper, Goldberg replicated Norman's results using a subset of Norman's term list.

In 1992, the NEO PI evolved into the NEO PI-R, adding the factors "Agreeableness" and "Conscientiousness," and becoming a Big Five instrument. This set the names for the factors that are now most commonly used. The NEO maintainers call their model the "Five Factor Model" (FFM). Each NEO personality dimension has six subordinate facets.

Nederlander Wim Hofstee at the University of Groningen used a lexical hypothesis approach with the Nederlands language to develop what became the International Personality Item Pool in the 1990s. Further development in Germany and the United States (involving Lewis Goldberg) saw the pool based on three languages. Its questions and results have been mapped to various Big Five personality typing models.

Canadians Kibeom Lee and Michael Ashton released a book describing their HEXACO model in 2004. It adds a sixth factor, "Honesty-Humility" to the five (which it calls "Emotionality", "Extraversion", "Agreeableness", "Conscientiousness", and "Openness to Experience"). Each of these factors has four facets.

In 2007, Colin DeYoung (Yale), Lena C. Quilty (CAMH) and Jordan Peterson (Toronto) concluded that the 10 aspects of the Big Five may have distinct biological substrates. This was derived through factor analyses of two data samples with the International Personality Item Pool, followed by cross-correlation with scores derived from 10 genetic factors identified as underlying the shared variance among the Revised NEO Personality Inventory facets.

By 2009, personality and social psychologists generally agreed that both personal and situational variables are needed to account for human behavior.

Colin G. DeYoung et al. (2016) researched the Big Five model and how the five broad factors are compatible with the 25 scales of the DSM-5's Personality Inventory (PID-5). DeYoung et al. considers the PID-5 to measure facet-level traits. Because the Big Five factors are broader than the 25 scales of the PID-5, there is disagreement in personality psychology relating to the number of factors within the Big Five. According to DeYoung et al., "the number of valid facets might be limited only by the number of traits that can be shown to have discriminant validity."

A FFM-associated test was used by Cambridge Analytica, and was part of the "psychographic profiling" controversy during the 2016 US presidential election.

Biological and developmental factors
The factors that influence a personality are called the determinants of personality. These factors determine the traits which a person develops in the course of development from a child.

Temperament vis-à-vis personality

There are debates between researchers of temperament and researchers of personality as to whether or not biologically based differences define a concept of temperament or a part of personality. The presence of such differences in pre-cultural individuals (such as animals or young infants) suggests that they belong to temperament since personality is a socio-cultural concept. For this reason developmental psychologists generally interpret individual differences in children as an expression of temperament rather than personality. Some researchers argue that temperaments and personality traits are age-specific manifestations of virtually the same latent qualities. Some believe that early childhood temperaments may become adolescent and adult personality traits as individuals' basic genetic characteristics actively, reactively, and passively interact with their changing environments.

Researchers of adult temperament point out that, similarly to sex, age, and mental illness, temperament is based on biochemical systems whereas personality is a product of socialization of an individual possessing these four types of features. Temperament interacts with social-cultural factors, but still cannot be controlled or easily changed by these factors.
Therefore, it is suggested that temperament should be kept as an independent concept for further studies and not be conflated with personality. Moreover, temperament refers to dynamical features of behavior (energetic, tempo, sensitivity and emotionality-related), whereas personality is to be considered a psycho-social construct comprising the content characteristics of human behavior (such as values, attitudes, habits, preferences, personal history, self-image). Temperament researchers point out that the lack of attention to extant temperament research by the developers of the Big Five model led to an overlap between its dimensions and dimensions described in multiple temperament models much earlier. For example, neuroticism reflects the traditional temperament dimension of emotionality, extraversion the temperament dimension of "energy" or "activity", and openness to experience the temperament dimension of sensation-seeking.

Heritability

A 1996 behavioural genetics study of twins suggested that heritability and environmental factors both influence all five factors to the same degree. Among four twin studies examined in 2003, the mean percentage for heritability was calculated for each personality and it was concluded that heritability influenced the five factors broadly. The self-report measures were as follows: openness to experience was estimated to have a 57% genetic influence, extraversion 54%, conscientiousness 49%, neuroticism 48%, and agreeableness 42%.

Non-humans

The Big Five personality traits have been assessed in some non-human species but methodology is debatable. In one series of studies, human ratings of chimpanzees using the Hominoid Personality Questionnaire, revealed factors of extraversion, conscientiousness and agreeableness – as well as an additional factor of dominance – across hundreds of chimpanzees in zoological parks, a large naturalistic sanctuary, and a research laboratory. Neuroticism and openness factors were found in an original zoo sample, but were not replicated in a new zoo sample or in other settings (perhaps reflecting the design of the CPQ). A study review found that markers for the three dimensions extraversion, neuroticism, and agreeableness were found most consistently across different species, followed by
openness; only chimpanzees showed markers for conscientious behavior.

A study completed in 2020 concluded that dolphins have some similar personality traits to humans. Both are large brained intelligent animals but have evolved separately for millions of years.

Development during childhood and adolescence

Research on the Big Five, and personality in general, has focused primarily on individual differences in adulthood, rather than in childhood and adolescence, and often include temperament traits. Recently, there has been growing recognition of the need to study child and adolescent personality trait development in order to understand how traits develop and change throughout the lifespan.

Recent studies have begun to explore the developmental origins and trajectories of the Big Five among children and adolescents, especially those that relate to temperament. Many researchers have sought to distinguish between personality and temperament. Temperament often refers to early behavioral and affective characteristics that are thought to be driven primarily by genes. Models of temperament often include four trait dimensions: surgency/sociability, negative emotionality, persistence/effortful control, and activity level. Some of these differences in temperament are evident at, if not before, birth. For example, both parents and researchers recognize that some newborn infants are peaceful and easily soothed while others are comparatively fussy and hard to calm. Unlike temperament, however, many researchers view the development of personality as gradually occurring throughout childhood. Contrary to some researchers who question whether children have stable personality traits, Big Five or otherwise, most researchers contend that there are significant psychological differences between children that are associated with relatively stable, distinct, and salient behavior patterns.

The structure, manifestations, and development of the Big Five in childhood and adolescence have been studied using a variety of methods, including parent- and teacher-ratings, preadolescent and adolescent self- and peer-ratings, and observations of parent-child interactions. Results from these studies support the relative stability of personality traits across the human lifespan, at least from preschool age through adulthood. More specifically, research suggests that four of the Big Five – namely Extraversion, Neuroticism, Conscientiousness, and Agreeableness – reliably describe personality differences in childhood, adolescence, and adulthood. However, some evidence suggests that Openness may not be a fundamental, stable part of childhood personality. Although some researchers have found that Openness in children and adolescents relates to attributes such as creativity, curiosity, imagination, and intellect, many researchers have failed to find distinct individual differences in Openness in childhood and early adolescence. Potentially, Openness may (a) manifest in unique, currently unknown ways in childhood or (b) may only manifest as children develop socially and cognitively. Other studies have found evidence for all of the Big Five traits in childhood and adolescence as well as two other child-specific traits: Irritability and Activity. Despite these specific differences, the majority of findings suggest that personality traits – particularly Extraversion, Neuroticism, Conscientiousness, and Agreeableness – are evident in childhood and adolescence and are associated with distinct social-emotional patterns of behavior that are largely consistent with adult manifestations of those same personality traits. Some researchers have proposed the youth personality trait is best described by six trait dimensions: neuroticism, extraversion, openness to experience, agreeableness, conscientiousness, and activity. Despite some preliminary evidence for this "Little Six" model, research in this area has been delayed by a lack of available measures.

Previous research has found evidence that most adults become more agreeable, conscientious, and less neurotic as they age. This has been referred to as the maturation effect. Many researchers have sought to investigate how trends in adult personality development compare to trends in youth personality development. Two main population-level indices have been important in this area of research: rank-order consistency and mean-level consistency. Rank-order consistency indicates the relative placement of individuals within a group. Mean-level consistency indicates whether groups increase or decrease on certain traits throughout the lifetime.

Findings from these studies indicate that, consistent with adult personality trends, youth personality becomes increasingly more stable in terms of rank-order throughout childhood. Unlike adult personality research, which indicates that people become agreeable, conscientious, and emotionally stable with age, some findings in youth personality research have indicated that mean levels of agreeableness, conscientiousness, and openness to experience decline from late childhood to late adolescence. The disruption hypothesis, which proposes that biological, social, and psychological changes experienced during youth result in temporary dips in maturity, has been proposed to explain these findings.

Extraversion/positive emotionality

In Big Five studies, extraversion has been associated with surgency. Children with high Extraversion are energetic, talkative, social, and dominant with children and adults; whereas, children with low Extraversion tend to be quiet, calm, inhibited, and submissive to other children and adults. Individual differences in Extraversion first manifest in infancy as varying levels of positive emotionality. These differences in turn predict social and physical activity during later childhood and may represent, or be associated with, the behavioral activation system. In children, Extraversion/Positive Emotionality includes four sub-traits: three traits that are similar to the previously described traits of temperament – activity, sociability, shyness, and the trait of dominance.

Activity: Similarly to findings in temperament research, children with high activity tend to have high energy levels and more intense and frequent motor activity compared to their peers. Salient differences in activity reliably manifest in infancy, persist through adolescence, and fade as motor activity decreases in adulthood or potentially develops into talkativeness.
Dominance: Children with high dominance tend to influence the behavior of others, particularly their peers, to obtain desirable rewards or outcomes. Such children are generally skilled at organizing activities and games and deceiving others by controlling their nonverbal behavior.
Shyness: Children with high shyness are generally socially withdrawn, nervous, and inhibited around strangers. In time, such children may become fearful even around "known others", especially if their peers reject them. Similar pattern was described in temperament longitudinal studies of shyness
Sociability: Children with high sociability generally prefer to be with others rather than alone. During middle childhood, the distinction between low sociability and high shyness becomes more pronounced, particularly as children gain greater control over how and where they spend their time.

Development throughout adulthood
Many studies of longitudinal data, which correlate people's test scores over time, and cross-sectional data, which compare personality levels across different age groups, show a high degree of stability in personality traits during adulthood, especially Neuroticism that is often regarded as a temperament trait  similarly to longitudinal research in temperament for the same traits. It is shown that the personality stabilizes for working-age individuals within about four years after starting working. There is also little evidence that adverse life events can have any significant impact on the personality of individuals. More recent research and meta-analyses of previous studies, however, indicate that change occurs in all five traits at various points in the lifespan. The new research shows evidence for a maturation effect. On average, levels of agreeableness and conscientiousness typically increase with time, whereas extraversion, neuroticism, and openness tend to decrease. Research has also demonstrated that changes in Big Five personality traits depend on the individual's current stage of development. For example, levels of agreeableness and conscientiousness demonstrate a negative trend during childhood and early adolescence before trending upwards during late adolescence and into adulthood. In addition to these group effects, there are individual differences: different people demonstrate unique patterns of change at all stages of life.

In addition, some research (Fleeson, 2001) suggests that the Big Five should not be conceived of as dichotomies (such as extraversion vs. introversion) but as continua. Each individual has the capacity to move along each dimension as circumstances (social or temporal) change. He is or she is therefore not simply on one end of each trait dichotomy but is a blend of both, exhibiting some characteristics more often than others:

Research regarding personality with growing age has suggested that as individuals enter their elder years (79–86), those with lower IQ see a raise in extraversion, but a decline in conscientiousness and physical well-being.

Group differences

Gender differences
Some cross-cultural research has shown some patterns of gender differences on responses to the NEO-PI-R and the Big Five Inventory. For example, women consistently report higher Neuroticism, Agreeableness, warmth (an extraversion facet) and openness to feelings, and men often report higher assertiveness (a facet of extraversion) and openness to ideas as assessed by the NEO-PI-R.

A study of gender differences in 55 nations using the Big Five Inventory found that women tended to be somewhat higher than men in neuroticism, extraversion, agreeableness, and conscientiousness. The difference in neuroticism was the most prominent and consistent, with significant differences found in 49 of the 55 nations surveyed.

Gender differences in personality traits are largest in prosperous, healthy, and more gender-egalitarian nations. The explanation for this given by the researchers of a 2001 paper is that acts by women in individualistic, egalitarian countries are more likely to be attributed to their personality, rather than being attributed to ascribed gender roles within collectivist, traditional countries.

Measured differences in the magnitude of sex differences between more or less developed world regions were caused by the changes in the measured personalities of men, not women, in these respective regions. That is, men in highly developed world regions were less neurotic, less extraverted, less conscientious and less agreeable compared to men in less developed world regions. Women, on the other hand tended not to differ in personality traits across regions.

The authors of this 2008 study speculated that resource-poor environments (that is, countries with low levels of development) may inhibit the development of gender differences, whereas resource-rich environments facilitate them. This may be because males require more resources than females in order to reach their full personality potential of less conscientious, less agreeable, less neurotic, and less extraverted. The authors also speculated in their discussion that due to different evolutionary pressures, men may have evolved to be more risk taking and socially dominant, whereas women evolved to be more cautious and nurturing. The authors further posited that ancient hunter-gatherer societies may have been more egalitarian than later agriculturally oriented societies. Hence, the development of gender inequalities may have acted to constrain the development of gender differences in personality that originally evolved in hunter-gatherer societies. As modern societies have become more egalitarian, again, it may be that innate sex differences are no longer constrained and hence manifest more fully than in less-wealthy cultures. This is one interpretation of the results among other possible interpretations.

Birth-order differences

Frank Sulloway argues that firstborns are more conscientious, more socially dominant, less agreeable, and less open to new ideas compared to siblings that were born later. Large-scale studies using random samples and self-report personality tests, however, have found milder effects than Sulloway claimed, or no significant effects of birth order on personality. A study using the Project Talent data, which is a large-scale representative survey of American high school students, with 272,003 eligible participants, found statistically significant but very small effects (the average absolute correlation between birth order and personality was .02) of birth order on personality, such that firstborns were slightly more conscientious, dominant, and agreeable, while also being less neurotic and less sociable. Parental socioeconomic status and participant gender had much larger correlations with personality.

In 2002, the Journal of Psychology posted a Big Five Personality Trait Difference; where researchers explored the relationship between the five-factor model and the Universal-Diverse Orientation (UDO) in counselor trainees. (Thompson, R., Brossart, D., and Mivielle, A., 2002). UDO is known as one social attitude that produces a strong awareness and/or acceptance towards the similarities and differences among individuals. (Miville, M., Romas, J., Johnson, J., and Lon, R. 2002) The study found that the counselor trainees that are more open to the idea of creative expression (a facet of Openness to Experience, Openness to Aesthetics) among individuals are more likely to work with a diverse group of clients, and feel comfortable in their role.

Cultural differences

The Big Five have been pursued in a variety of languages and cultures, such as German, Chinese, and Indian. For example, Thompson has claimed to find the Big Five structure across several cultures using an international English language scale.
Cheung, van de Vijver, and Leong (2011) suggest, however, that the Openness factor is particularly unsupported in Asian countries and that a different fifth factor is identified.

Recent work has found relationships between Geert Hofstede's cultural factors, Individualism, Power Distance, Masculinity, and Uncertainty Avoidance, with the average Big Five scores in a country. For instance, the degree to which a country values individualism correlates with its average extraversion, whereas people living in cultures which are accepting of large inequalities in their power structures tend to score somewhat higher on conscientiousness.

Personality differences around the world might even have contributed to the emergence of different political systems. A recent study has found that countries' average personality trait levels are correlated with their political systems: countries with higher average trait Openness tended to have more democratic institutions, an association that held even after factoring out other relevant influences such as economic development.

Attempts to replicate the Big Five in other countries with local dictionaries have succeeded in some countries but not in others. Apparently, for instance, Hungarians do not appear to have a single agreeableness factor. Other researchers have found evidence for agreeableness but not for other factors. It is important to recognize that individual differences in traits are relevant in a specific cultural context, and that the traits do not have their effects outside of that context.

Health

Personality change from disease 
Some diseases cause changes in personality. For example, although gradual memory impairment is the hallmark feature of Alzheimer's disease, a systematic review of personality changes in Alzheimer's disease by Robins Wahlin and Byrne, published in 2011, found systematic and consistent trait changes mapped to the Big Five. The largest change observed was a decrease in conscientiousness. The next most significant changes were an increase in Neuroticism and decrease in Extraversion, but Openness and Agreeableness were also decreased. These changes in personality could assist with early diagnosis.

Personality disorders 

, there were over fifty published studies relating the FFM to personality disorders. Since that time, quite a number of additional studies have expanded on this research base and provided further empirical support for understanding the DSM personality disorders in terms of the FFM domains.

In her review of the personality disorder literature published in 2007, Lee Anna Clark asserted that "the five-factor model of personality is widely accepted as representing the higher-order structure of both normal and abnormal personality traits". However, other researchers disagree that this model is widely accepted (see the section Critique below) and suggest that it simply replicates early temperament research. Noticeably, FFM publications never compare their findings to temperament models even though temperament and mental disorders (especially personality disorders) are thought to be based on the same neurotransmitter imbalances, just to varying degrees.

The five-factor model was claimed to significantly predict all ten personality disorder symptoms and outperform the Minnesota Multiphasic Personality Inventory (MMPI) in the prediction of borderline, avoidant, and dependent personality disorder symptoms. However, most predictions related to an increase in Neuroticism and a decrease in Agreeableness, and therefore did not differentiate between the disorders very well.

Common mental disorders

Converging evidence from several nationally representative studies has established three classes of mental disorders which are especially common in the general population: Depressive disorders (e.g., major depressive disorder (MDD), dysthymic disorder), anxiety disorders (e.g., generalized anxiety disorder (GAD), post-traumatic stress disorder (PTSD), panic disorder, agoraphobia, specific phobia, and social phobia), and substance use disorders (SUDs). The Five Factor personality profiles of users of different drugs may be different.

These common mental disorders (CMDs) have been empirically linked to the Big Five personality traits, neuroticism in particular. Numerous studies have found that having high scores of neuroticism significantly increases one's risk for developing a common mental disorder. A large-scale meta-analysis (n > 75,000) examining the relationship between all of the Big Five personality traits and common mental disorders found that low conscientiousness yielded consistently strong effects for each common mental disorder examined (i.e., MDD, dysthymic disorder, GAD, PTSD, panic disorder, agoraphobia, social phobia, specific phobia, and SUD). This finding parallels research on physical health, which has established that conscientiousness is the strongest personality predictor of reduced mortality, and is highly negatively correlated with making poor health choices. In regards to the other personality domains, the meta-analysis found that all common mental disorders examined were defined by high neuroticism, most exhibited low extraversion, only SUD was linked to agreeableness (negatively), and no disorders were associated with Openness. A meta-analysis of 59 longitudinal studies showed that high neuroticism predicted the development of anxiety, depression, substance abuse, psychosis, schizophrenia, and non-specific mental distress, also after adjustment for baseline symptoms and psychiatric history.

The personality-psychopathology models

Five major models have been posed to explain the nature of the relationship between personality and mental illness. There is currently no single "best model", as each of them has received at least some empirical support. It is also important to note that these models are not mutually exclusive – more than one may be operating for a particular individual and various mental disorders may be explained by different models.
 The Vulnerability/Risk Model: According to this model, personality contributes to the onset or etiology of various common mental disorders. In other words, pre-existing personality traits either cause the development of CMDs directly or enhance the impact of causal risk factors. There is strong support for neuroticism being a robust vulnerability factor.
 The Pathoplasty Model: This model proposes that premorbid personality traits impact the expression, course, severity, and/or treatment response of a mental disorder. An example of this relationship would be a heightened likelihood of committing suicide in a depressed individual who also has low levels of constraint.
 The Common Cause Model: According to the common cause model, personality traits are predictive of CMDs because personality and psychopathology have shared genetic and environmental determinants which result in non-causal associations between the two constructs.
 The Spectrum Model: This model proposes that associations between personality and psychopathology are found because these two constructs both occupy a single domain or spectrum and psychopathology is simply a display of the extremes of normal personality function. Support for this model is provided by an issue of criterion overlap. For instance, two of the primary facet scales of neuroticism in the NEO-PI-R are "depression" and "anxiety". Thus the fact that diagnostic criteria for depression, anxiety, and neuroticism assess the same content increases the correlations between these domains.
 The Scar Model: According to the scar model, episodes of a mental disorder 'scar' an individual's personality, changing it in significant ways from premorbid functioning. An example of a scar effect would be a decrease in openness to experience following an episode of PTSD.

Physical health
To examine how the Big Five personality traits are related to subjective health outcomes (positive and negative mood, physical symptoms, and general health concern) and objective health conditions (chronic illness, serious illness, and physical injuries), Jasna Hudek-Knezevic and Igor Kardum conducted a study from a sample of 822 healthy volunteers (438 women and 384 men). Out of the Big Five personality traits, they found neuroticism most related to worse subjective health outcomes and optimistic control to better subjective health outcomes. When relating to objective health conditions, connections drawn were presented weak, except that neuroticism significantly predicted chronic illness, whereas optimistic control was more closely related to physical injuries caused by accident.

Being highly conscientious may add as much as five years to one's life. The Big Five personality traits also predict positive health outcomes. In an elderly Japanese sample, conscientiousness, extraversion, and openness were related to lower risk of mortality.

Higher conscientiousness is associated with lower obesity risk. In already obese individuals, higher conscientiousness is associated with a higher likelihood of becoming non-obese over a five-year period.

Effect of personality traits through life

Education

Academic achievement

Personality plays an important role in academic achievement. A study of 308 undergraduates who completed the Five Factor Inventory Processes and reported their GPA suggested that conscientiousness and agreeableness have a positive relationship with all types of learning styles (synthesis-analysis, methodical study, fact retention, and elaborative processing), whereas neuroticism shows an inverse relationship. Moreover, extraversion and openness were proportional to elaborative processing. The Big Five personality traits accounted for 14% of the variance in GPA, suggesting that personality traits make some contributions to academic performance. Furthermore, reflective learning styles (synthesis-analysis and elaborative processing) were able to mediate the relationship between openness and GPA. These results indicate that intellectual curiosity significantly enhances academic performance if students combine their scholarly interest with thoughtful information processing.

A recent study of Israeli high-school students found that those in the gifted program systematically scored higher on openness and lower on neuroticism than those not in the gifted program. While not a measure of the Big Five, gifted students also reported less state anxiety than students not in the gifted program. Specific Big Five personality traits predict learning styles in addition to academic success.

GPA and exam performance are both predicted by conscientiousness
neuroticism is negatively related to academic success
openness predicts utilizing synthesis-analysis and elaborative-processing learning styles
neuroticism negatively correlates with learning styles in general
openness and extraversion both predict all four learning styles.

Studies conducted on college students have concluded that hope, which is linked to agreeableness, conscientiousness, neuroticism, and openness, has a positive effect on psychological well-being. Individuals high in neurotic tendencies are less likely to display hopeful tendencies and are negatively associated with well-being. Personality can sometimes be flexible and measuring the big five personality for individuals as they enter certain stages of life may predict their educational identity. Recent studies have suggested the likelihood of an individual's personality affecting their educational identity.

Learning styles
Learning styles have been described as "enduring ways of thinking and processing information".

In 2008, the Association for Psychological Science (APS) commissioned a report that concludes that no significant evidence exists that learning-style assessments should be included in the education system. Thus it is premature, at best, to conclude that the evidence links the Big Five to "learning styles", or "learning styles" to learning itself.

However, the APS report also suggested that all existing learning styles have not been exhausted and that there could exist learning styles worthy of being included in educational practices. There are studies that conclude that personality and thinking styles may be intertwined in ways that link thinking styles to the Big Five personality traits. There is no general consensus on the number or specifications of particular learning styles, but there have been many different proposals.

As one example, Schmeck, Ribich, and Ramanaiah (1997) defined four types of learning styles:

synthesis analysis
methodical study
fact retention
elaborative processing

When all four facets are implicated within the classroom, they will each likely improve academic achievement. This model asserts that students develop either agentic/shallow processing or reflective/deep processing. Deep processors are more often found to be more conscientious, intellectually open, and extraverted than shallow processors. Deep processing is associated with appropriate study methods (methodical study) and a stronger ability to analyze information (synthesis analysis), whereas shallow processors prefer structured fact retention learning styles and are better suited for elaborative processing. The main functions of these four specific learning styles are as follows:

Openness has been linked to learning styles that often lead to academic success and higher grades like synthesis analysis and methodical study. Because conscientiousness and openness have been shown to predict all four learning styles, it suggests that individuals who possess characteristics like discipline, determination, and curiosity are more likely to engage in all of the above learning styles.

According to the research carried out by Komarraju, Karau, Schmeck & Avdic (2011), conscientiousness and agreeableness are positively related with all four learning styles, whereas neuroticism was negatively related with those four. Furthermore, extraversion and openness were only positively related to elaborative processing, and openness itself correlated with higher academic achievement.

In addition, a previous study by psychologist Mikael Jensen has shown relationships between the Big Five personality traits, learning, and academic achievement. According to Jensen, all personality traits, except neuroticism, are associated with learning goals and motivation. Openness and conscientiousness influence individuals to learn to a high degree unrecognized, while extraversion and agreeableness have similar effects. Conscientiousness and neuroticism also influence individuals to perform well in front of others for a sense of credit and reward, while agreeableness forces individuals to avoid this strategy of learning. Jensen's study concludes that individuals who score high on the agreeableness trait will likely learn just to perform well in front of others.

Besides openness, all Big Five personality traits helped predict the educational identity of students. Based on these findings, scientists are beginning to see that the Big Five traits might have a large influence of on academic motivation that leads to predicting a student's academic performance.

Some authors suggested that Big Five personality traits combined with learning styles can help predict some variations in the academic performance and the academic motivation of an individual which can then influence their academic achievements. This may be seen because individual differences in personality represent stable approaches to information processing. For instance, conscientiousness has consistently emerged as a stable predictor of success in exam performance, largely because conscientious students experience fewer study delays. Conscientiousness shows a positive association with the four learning styles because students with high levels of conscientiousness develop focused learning strategies and appear to be more disciplined and achievement-oriented.

Distance Learning
When the relationship between the five-factor personality traits and academic achievement in distance education settings was examined in brief, the openness personality trait was found to be the most important variable that has a positive relationship with academic achievement in distance education environments. In addition, it was found that self-discipline, extraversion, and adaptability personality traits are generally in a positive relationship with academic achievement. The most important personality trait that has a negative relationship with academic achievement has emerged as neuroticism. The results generally show that individuals who are organized, planned, determined, who are oriented to new ideas and independent thinking have increased success in distance education environments. On the other hand, it can be said that individuals with anxiety and stress tendencies generally have lower academic success.

Employment

Occupation and personality fit

Researchers have long suggested that work is more likely to be fulfilling to the individual and beneficial to society when there is alignment between the person and their occupation. For instance, software programmers and scientists were generally more open to experiencing a variety of new activities, were intellectually curious, tended to think in symbols and abstractions, and found repetition boring.

Work success

It is believed that the Big Five traits are predictors of future performance outcomes. Job outcome measures include job and training proficiency and personnel data. However, research demonstrating such prediction has been criticized, in part because of the apparently low correlation coefficients characterizing the relationship between personality and job performance. In a 2007 article co-authored by six current or former editors of psychological journals, Dr. Kevin Murphy, Professor of Psychology at Pennsylvania State University and Editor of the Journal of Applied Psychology (1996–2002), states:

Such criticisms were put forward by Walter Mischel, whose publication caused a two-decades' long crisis in personality psychometrics. However, later work demonstrated (1) that the correlations obtained by psychometric personality researchers were actually very respectable by comparative standards, and (2) that the economic value of even incremental increases in prediction accuracy was exceptionally large, given the vast difference in performance by those who occupy complex job positions.

There have been studies that link national innovation to openness to experience and conscientiousness. Those who express these traits have showed leadership and beneficial ideas towards the country of origin.

Some businesses, organizations, and interviewers assess individuals based on the Big Five personality traits. Research has suggested that individuals who are considered leaders typically exhibit lower amounts of neurotic traits, maintain higher levels of openness (envisioning success), balanced levels of conscientiousness (well-organized), and balanced levels of extraversion (outgoing, but not excessive).
Further studies have linked professional burnout to neuroticism, and extraversion to enduring positive work experience. When it comes to making money, research has suggested that those who are high in agreeableness (especially men) are not as successful in accumulating income.

Some research suggests that vocational outcomes are correlated to Big Five personality traits. Conscientiousness predicts job performance in general. Conscientiousness is considered as top-ranked in overall job performance, research further categorized the Big 5 behaviors into 3 perspectives: task performance, organizational citizenship behavior, and counterproductive work behavior. Task performance is the set of activity that a worker is hired to complete, and results showed that Extraversion ranked second after the Conscientiousness, with Emotional Stability tied with Agreeableness ranked third. For organizational citizenship behavior, relatively less tied to the specific task core but benefits an organization by contributing to its social and psychological environment, Agreeableness and Emotional Stability ranked second and third. Lastly, Agreeableness tied with Conscientiousness as top ranked for Counterproductive work behavior, which refers to intentional behavior that is counter to the legitimate interests of the organization or its members.

In addition, research has demonstrated that agreeableness is negatively related to salary. Those high in agreeableness make less, on average, than those low in the same trait. Neuroticism is also negatively related to salary while conscientiousness and extraversion are positive predictors of salary. Occupational self-efficacy has also been shown to be positively correlated with conscientiousness and negatively correlated with neuroticism. Significant predictors of career-advancement goals are: extraversion, conscientiousness, and agreeableness. Some research has also suggested that the Conscientiousness of a supervisor is positively associated with an employee's perception of abusive supervision. While others have suggested that those with low agreeableness and high neuroticism are traits more related to abusive supervision.

A 2019 study of Canadian adults found conscientiousness to be positively associated with wages, while agreeableness, extraversion, and neuroticism were negatively associated with wages. In the United States, by contrast, no negative correlation between extraversion and wages has been found. Also, the magnitudes found for agreeableness and conscientiousness in this study were higher for women than for men (i.e. there was a higher negative penalty for greater agreeableness in women, as well as a higher positive reward for greater conscientiousness).

Research designed to investigate the individual effects of Big Five personality traits on work performance via worker completed surveys and supervisor ratings of work performance has implicated individual traits in several different work roles performances. A "work role" is defined as the responsibilities an individual has while they are working. Nine work roles have been identified, which can be classified in three broader categories: proficiency (the ability of a worker to effectively perform their work duties), adaptivity (a workers ability to change working strategies in response to changing work environments), and proactivity (extent to which a worker will spontaneously put forth effort to change the work environment). These three categories of behavior can then be directed towards three different levels: either the individual, team, or organizational level leading to the nine different work role performance possibilities.

Openness is positively related to proactivity at the individual and the organizational levels and is negatively related to team and organizational proficiency. These effects were found to be completely independent of one another. This is also counter-conscientious and has a negative correlation to Conscientiousness.
Agreeableness is negatively related to individual task proactivity. Typically this is associated with lower career success and being less able to cope with conflict.
Extraversion is negatively related to individual task proficiency. Extraversion has a higher job and life satisfaction but more impulsive behaviors.
Conscientiousness is positively related to all forms of work role performance. This has a higher leadership effectiveness and lower deviance behaviors but also lower learning in skill acquisition.
Neuroticism is negatively related to all forms of work role performance. This has a trend to engage in more risky behaviors 

Two theories have been integrated in an attempt to account for these differences in work role performance. Trait activation theory posits that within a person trait levels predict future behavior, that trait levels differ between people, and that work-related cues activate traits which leads to work relevant behaviors. Role theory suggests that role senders provide cues to elicit desired behaviors. In this context, role senders (i.e.: supervisors, managers, etc.) provide workers with cues for expected behaviors, which in turn activates personality traits and work relevant behaviors. In essence, expectations of the role sender lead to different behavioral outcomes depending on the trait levels of individual workers and because people differ in trait levels, responses to these cues will not be universal.

Romantic relationships 

The Big Five model of personality was used for attempts to predict satisfaction in romantic relationships, relationship quality in dating, engaged, and married couples.

Dating couples
Self-reported relationship quality is negatively related to partner-reported neuroticism and positively related to both self- and partner-reported conscientiousness

Engaged couples
Self-reported relationship quality was higher among those high in partner-reported openness, agreeableness and conscientiousness.
Self-reported relationship quality was higher among those high in self-reported extraversion and agreeableness.
Self-reported relationship quality is negatively related to both self- and partner-reported neuroticism
Observers rated the relationship quality higher if the participating partner's self-reported extraversion was high

Married couples
High self-reported neuroticism, extraversion, and agreeableness are related to high levels of self-reported relationship quality
Partner-reported agreeableness is related to observed relationship quality.

These reports are, however, rare and not conclusive.

Political identification 

The Big Five Personality Model also has applications in the study of political psychology. Studies have been finding links between the big five personality traits and political identification. It has been found by several studies that individuals who score high in Conscientiousness are more likely to possess a right-wing political identification. On the opposite end of the spectrum, a strong correlation was identified between high scores in Openness to Experience and a left-leaning ideology. While the traits of agreeableness, extraversion, and neuroticism have not been consistently linked to either conservative or liberal ideology, with studies producing mixed results, such traits are promising when analyzing the strength of an individual's party identification. However, correlations between the Big Five and political beliefs, while present, tend to be small, with one study finding correlations ranged from 0.14 to 0.24.

Scope of predictive power 

The predictive effects of the Big Five personality traits relate mostly to social functioning and rules-driven behavior and are not very specific for prediction of particular aspects of behavior. For example, it was noted that high neuroticism precedes the development of all common mental disorders and is not associated with personality by all temperament researchers. Further evidence is required to fully uncover the nature and differences between personality traits, temperament and life outcomes. Social and contextual parameters also play a role in outcomes and the interaction between the two is not yet fully understood.

Religiosity 

Though the effect sizes are small: Of the Big Five personality traits high Agreeableness, Conscientiousness and Extraversion relate to general religiosity, while Openness relate negatively to religious fundamentalism and positively to spirituality. High Neuroticism may be related to extrinsic religiosity, whereas intrinsic religiosity and spirituality reflect Emotional Stability.

Measurements

Several measures of the Big Five exist:

 International Personality Item Pool (IPIP)
 NEO-PI-R
 The Ten-Item Personality Inventory (TIPI) and the Five Item Personality Inventory (FIPI) are very abbreviated rating forms of the Big Five personality traits.
 Self-descriptive sentence questionnaires
 Lexical questionnaires
 Self-report questionnaires
 Relative-scored Big 5 measure

The most frequently used measures of the Big Five comprise either items that are self-descriptive sentences or, in the case of lexical measures, items that are single adjectives. Due to the length of sentence-based and some lexical measures, short forms have been developed and validated for use in applied research settings where questionnaire space and respondent time are limited, such as the 40-item balanced International English Big-Five Mini-Markers or a very brief (10 item) measure of the Big Five domains. Research has suggested that some methodologies in administering personality tests are inadequate in length and provide insufficient detail to truly evaluate personality. Usually, longer, more detailed questions will give a more accurate portrayal of personality. The five factor structure has been replicated in peer reports. However, many of the substantive findings rely on self-reports.

Much of the evidence on the measures of the Big 5 relies on self-report questionnaires, which makes self-report bias and falsification of responses difficult to deal with and account for. It has been argued that the Big Five tests do not create an accurate personality profile because the responses given on these tests are not true in all cases and can be falsified. For example, questionnaires are answered by potential employees who might choose answers that paint them in the best light.

Research suggests that a relative-scored Big Five measure in which respondents had to make repeated choices between equally desirable personality descriptors may be a potential alternative to traditional Big Five measures in accurately assessing personality traits, especially when lying or biased responding is present. When compared with a traditional Big Five measure for its ability to predict GPA and creative achievement under both normal and "fake good"-bias response conditions, the relative-scored measure significantly and consistently predicted these outcomes under both conditions; however, the Likert questionnaire lost its predictive ability in the faking condition. Thus, the relative-scored measure proved to be less affected by biased responding than the Likert measure of the Big Five.

Andrew H. Schwartz analyzed 700 million words, phrases, and topic instances collected from the Facebook messages of 75,000 volunteers, who also took standard personality tests, and found striking variations in language with personality, gender, and age.

Critique
The proposed Big Five model has been subjected to considerable critical scrutiny in a number of published studies. One prominent critic of the model has been Jack Block at the University of California, Berkeley. In response to Block, the model was defended in a paper published by Costa and McCrae. This was followed by a number of published critical replies from Block.

It has been argued that there are limitations to the scope of the Big Five model as an explanatory or predictive theory. It has also been argued that measures of the Big Five account for only 56% of the normal personality trait sphere alone (not even considering the abnormal personality trait sphere). Also, the static Big Five is not theory driven, it is merely a statistically driven investigation of certain descriptors that tend to cluster together often based on less-than-optimal factor analytic procedures. Measures of the Big Five constructs appear to show some consistency in interviews, self-descriptions and observations, and this static five-factor structure seems to be found across a wide range of participants of different ages and cultures. However, while genotypic temperament trait dimensions might appear across different cultures, the phenotypic expression of personality traits differs profoundly across different cultures as a function of the different socio-cultural conditioning and experiential learning that takes place within different cultural settings.

Moreover, the fact that the Big Five model was based on lexical hypothesis (i.e. on the verbal descriptors of individual differences) indicated strong methodological flaws in this model, especially related to its main factors, Extraversion and Neuroticism. First, there is a natural pro-social bias of language in people's verbal evaluations. After all, language is an invention of group dynamics that was developed to facilitate socialization and the exchange of information and to synchronize group activity. This social function of language therefore creates a sociability bias in verbal descriptors of human behavior: there are more words related to social than physical or even mental aspects of behavior. The sheer number of such descriptors will cause them to group into the largest factor in any language, and such grouping has nothing to do with the way that core systems of individual differences are set up. Second, there is also a negativity bias in emotionality (i.e. most emotions have negative affectivity), and there are more words in language to describe negative rather than positive emotions. Such asymmetry in emotional valence creates another bias in language. Experiments using the lexical hypothesis approach indeed demonstrated that the use of lexical material skews the resulting dimensionality according to a sociability bias of language and a negativity bias of emotionality, grouping all evaluations around these two dimensions. This means that the two largest dimensions in the Big Five model might be just an artifact of the lexical approach that this model employed.

Limited scope
One common criticism is that the Big Five does not explain all of human personality. Some psychologists have dissented from the model precisely because they feel it neglects other domains of personality, such as religiosity, manipulativeness/machiavellianism, honesty, sexiness/seductiveness, thriftiness, conservativeness, masculinity/femininity, snobbishness/egotism, sense of humour, and risk-taking/thrill-seeking. Dan P. McAdams has called the Big Five a "psychology of the stranger", because they refer to traits that are relatively easy to observe in a stranger; other aspects of personality that are more privately held or more context-dependent are excluded from the Big Five.

There may be debate as to what counts as personality and what does not and the nature of the questions in the survey greatly influence outcome. Multiple particularly broad question databases have failed to produce the Big Five as the top five traits.

In many studies, the five factors are not fully orthogonal to one another; that is, the five factors are not independent. Orthogonality is viewed as desirable by some researchers because it minimizes redundancy between the dimensions. This is particularly important when the goal of a study is to provide a comprehensive description of personality with as few variables as possible.

Methodological issues
Factor analysis, the statistical method used to identify the dimensional structure of observed variables, lacks a universally recognized basis for choosing among solutions with different numbers of factors. A five factor solution depends on some degree of interpretation by the analyst. A larger number of factors may underlie these five factors. This has led to disputes about the "true" number of factors. Big Five proponents have responded that although other solutions may be viable in a single data set, only the five-factor structure consistently replicates across different studies.

Surveys in studies are often online surveys of college students. Results do not always replicate when run on other populations or in other languages.

Moreover, the factor analysis that this model is based on is a linear method incapable of capturing nonlinear, feedback and contingent relationships between core systems of individual differences.

Theoretical status
A frequent criticism is that the Big Five is not based on any underlying theory; it is merely an empirical finding that certain descriptors cluster together under factor analysis. Although this does not mean that these five factors do not exist, the underlying causes behind them are unknown.

Jack Block's final published work before his death in January 2010 drew together his lifetime perspective on the five-factor model.

He summarized his critique of the model in terms of:
 the atheoretical nature of the five-factors.
 their "cloudy" measurement.
 the model's inappropriateness for studying early childhood.
 the use of factor analysis as the exclusive paradigm for conceptualizing personality.
 the continuing non-consensual understandings of the five-factors.
 the existence of unrecognized but successful efforts to specify aspects of character not subsumed by the five-factors.

He went on to suggest that repeatedly observed higher order factors hierarchically above the proclaimed Big Five personality traits may promise deeper biological understanding of the origins and implications of these superfactors.

Evidence for six factors rather than five

It has been noted that even though early lexical studies in the English language indicated five large groups of personality traits, more recent, and more comprehensive, cross-language studies have provided evidence for six large groups rather than five, with the sixth factor being Honesty-Humility. These six groups form the basis of the HEXACO model of personality structure. Based on these findings it has been suggested that the Big Five system should be replaced by HEXACO, or revised to better align with lexical evidence.

See also 
Core self-evaluations
Dark triad
DISC assessment
Facet
Genomics of personality traits
Goal orientation
HEXACO model of personality structure
Moral foundations theory
Myers–Briggs Type Indicator
Personality psychology
Szondi test
Trait theory

References

External links 
International Personality Item Pool, public domain list of items keyed to the big five personality traits.
Selection from the "Handbook of personality: Theory and research" for researchers
 
U.S. Regions Exhibit Distinct Personalities, Research Reveals

Personality traits
1961 introductions